Marinus ("Rinus") van den Berge (12 March 1900 in Rotterdam – 23 October 1972) was a Dutch athlete, who competed mainly in the 100 metres.

He competed for the Netherlands in the 1924 Summer Olympics held in Paris, France in the 4 x 100 metres relay, where he won the bronze medal with his teammates Jan de Vries, Jacob Boot and Harry Broos.

References

External links
Extensive biography 
databaseolympics.com

1900 births
1972 deaths
Dutch male sprinters
Athletes (track and field) at the 1924 Summer Olympics
Athletes (track and field) at the 1928 Summer Olympics
Olympic athletes of the Netherlands
Olympic bronze medalists for the Netherlands
Athletes from Rotterdam
Medalists at the 1924 Summer Olympics
Olympic bronze medalists in athletics (track and field)